Grant Bramwell (born 28 January 1961 in Gisborne, New Zealand) is a sprint canoeist who competed in the 1980s. Competing in two Summer Olympics, he won a gold medal in the K-4 1000 m at Los Angeles in 1984 with Alan Thompson, Ian Ferguson and Paul MacDonald. Bramwell also won a K-1 10000 m bronze at the 1985 ICF Canoe Sprint World Championships in Mechelen.

After retiring from top-level canoeing Bramwell was a selector for New Zealand canoeing in the 1990s.

References
 
 
 
 

1961 births
Canoeists at the 1984 Summer Olympics
Canoeists at the 1988 Summer Olympics
Living people
New Zealand male canoeists
Olympic canoeists of New Zealand
Olympic gold medalists for New Zealand
Sportspeople from Gisborne, New Zealand
Olympic medalists in canoeing
ICF Canoe Sprint World Championships medalists in kayak
Medalists at the 1984 Summer Olympics